Sonjah Stanley Niaah is a Jamaican scholar, cultural activist and writer. She is known for her work on dancehall, old and new Black Atlantic performance geographies, ritual, dance, festivals, cultural and creative industries, as well as popular culture and the sacred.

Education and career 
Stanley Niaah has a B.S. from the University of the West Indies (1991) and received her diploma in sociology in 1997 from the University of the West Indies. In 2004 she earned a Ph.D. in cultural studies from the University of the West Indies, which made her the first Ph.D. cultural studies graduate from the University of the West Indies. She was also the first to be appointed lecturer, and senior lecturer in Cultural Studies, and in 2015, Stanley Niaah was named director of the Institute of Caribbean Studies and the Reggae Studies Unit. She is also the inaugural Rhodes Trust Rex Nettleford Fellow in Cultural Studies.

Work 
Stanley Niaah is a Jamaican nationalist and Caribbean regionalist at heart, she is involved in efforts to promote cultural and creative industries, and speaks up for respect for all cultures. She is an advocate for connecting education and music in Jamaica. and has spoken on the actions taken by women to improve their presentation to the public. Her 2010 book on Dancehall was reviewed by multiple venues, including Caribbean Quarterly and Caribbean Studies.

Selected publications

References

External links

Living people
Year of birth missing (living people)
University of the West Indies alumni
University of the West Indies academics
Dancehall
21st-century Jamaican women writers